Miramar Airport  is a public use airport serving Miramar, an Atlantic coastal town in the Buenos Aires Province of Argentina.

Runway length includes a  displaced threshold on each end of the runway.

See also

Transport in Argentina
List of airports in Argentina

References

External links 
OpenStreetMap - Miramar Airport
FallingRain - Miramar Airport

Airports in Argentina
Buenos Aires Province